Cycle of Eternity is the ninth studio album by the German electronic composer Peter Frohmader, released in 1994 by Cuneiform Records.

Track listing

Personnel 
Adapted from the Cycle of Eternity liner notes.
Peter Frohmader – instruments, illustrations

Release history

References

External links 
 Cycle of Eternity at Discogs (list of releases)
 Cycle of Eternity at Bandcamp

1994 albums
Cuneiform Records albums
Peter Frohmader albums